Susannah Pyatt (born 17 May 1990) is a New Zealand competitive sailor. She competed at the 2012 Summer Olympics in London, in the women's Elliott 6m with Stephanie Hazard and Jenna Hansen.

References

External links

1990 births
Living people
New Zealand female sailors (sport)
Olympic sailors of New Zealand
Sailors at the 2012 Summer Olympics – Elliott 6m